The 19565 / 19566 Okha–Dehradun Uttaranchal Express is an Express train belonging to Indian Railways – Western Railway zone that runs between  &  in India.

It operates as train number 19565 from Okha to Dehradun and as train number 19566 in the reverse direction, serving the states of Gujarat, Rajasthan, Haryana, Delhi, Uttar Pradesh and Uttarakhand.

It is named after the state of Uttarakhand which until October 2006 was known as Uttaranchal.

Coaches

The train has standard ICF rakes with max speed of 110 km/h. The train consists of 18 coaches:  .

 1 AC II Tier
 3 AC III Tier
 8 Sleeper coaches
 4 General Unreserved
 2 Seating cum Luggage Rake

As is customary with most train services in India, coach composition may be amended at the discretion of Indian Railways depending on demand.

Service

Route and halts

Schedule

Traction

As large sections of the route are yet to be electrified, a Vatva-based WDM-3A / WDM-3D locomotive powers the train to its destination.

References 

 http://www.indianrailways.gov.in/railwayboard/uploads/directorate/finance_budget/Previous%20Budget%20Speeches/2000-01.pdf
 http://www.holidayiq.com/railways/uttaranchal-express-19565-train.html
 https://www.youtube.com/watch?v=Q_Io8_tfq3g
 https://www.flickr.com/photos/wap5holic/12458269024/
 http://www.firstpost.com/topic/place/nepal-uttaranchal-express-with-vatva-wdm3d-11131-video-FXXBzzmznZo-1248-1.html
 https://indiarailinfo.com/train/7932
 https://indiarailinfo.com/train/7931
 https://archive.pib.gov.in/archive/releases98/lyr2000/rjun2000/r30062000.html

External links
 
 

Trains from Dehradun
Transport in Okha
Named passenger trains of India
Rail transport in Gujarat
Rail transport in Rajasthan
Rail transport in Haryana
Rail transport in Delhi
Railway services introduced in 2000
Express trains in India